Frankfurt Zoological Society (FZS) is an international conservation organization founded in 1858 with headquarters in Frankfurt am Main, Germany. FZS focuses on maintaining biodiversity and conserving wildlife and ecosystems in protected areas and outstanding wild places. FZS leads and supports about 30 projects in 18 countries. 
Bernhard Grzimek, renowned German zoo director, zoologist, book author, editor, and animal conservationist in postwar West-Germany, served as president of the Frankfurt Zoological Society for over forty years.

History
FZS was founded in 1858 by Frankfurt citizens to establish a zoo, the Frankfurt Zoological Garden, which it operated until the First World War.
The city council then assumed responsibility for the zoo until 1950, when the society again became the zoo's development association.
In the 1950s the society became involved in conservation in the Serengeti, and began supporting development of national parks in Africa. Since then the society has become increasingly involved in protecting and preserving endangered animals and their environments worldwide.

Activities
FZS provides logistical support to conservation areas around the world, sponsors animal census surveys, provides conservation-related education and gives advice to organizations involved in establishing conservation areas.
FZS participates in programs to protect highly endangered species and to reintroduce endangered species, acquires land for conservation areas and helps protect and regenerate natural landscapes.

Projects
Projects are designed as long-term and carried out in close cooperation with local organisations and authorities. Also, the integration of the local population is a vital aspect of FZS's project work.
FZS concentrates its efforts on habitats in grasslands, wetlands, forests and mountains.  All projects follow the common goal of maintaining wilderness and biodiversity.

Africa
Traditionally, many FZS projects are located in Tanzania. Currently, FZS is engaged in the protection of the Serengeti, the Selous and the Mahale Ecosystem and carries out research for the preservation of East Africas threatened habitats. 
Livestock and migration data is collected, rangers, scientists and veterinarians are educated and environmental education is promoted. 
Further projects are located in Zimbabwe (Gonarezhou sanctuary), Zambia (North Luangwa) and East Congo (Virunga and Maiko National Parks). Exemplary local partners are Tanzania National Parks Authority (TANAPA) and Tanzania Wildlife Research Institute (TAWIRI).

Asia
Another major project is situated in Central Sumatra: The Bukit Tigapuluh Sanctuary for the preservation of rainforest and wildlife. This project is aiming at the resettlement and reintroduction of confiscated  Orang Utans, which are prepared for their life in the wild through the local "jungle school". Further aspects of the work on site are conflict-prevention between humans and elephants, environmental education and initiatives supporting the local population in balancing out economical development and their traditions. 
Important project partners on site are the Bukit Tigapuluh National Park as well as the Orang Utan Project (TOP), the Jambi Province Conservation Authority and WWF.

In Kazakhstan, FZS is involved in the Altyn Dala Conservation Initiative. This international joint project furthers the protection of Kazakhstans unique grasslands and their keystone species. The initiative aims at building up a network of protected grasslands in central Kazakhstan. A special focus lies on the saiga-antelopes, of the Betpak-Dala population as they hold a key role in the ecosystems of the steppes and semi-deserts. 
Exemplary local project-partners are the Association for the Conservation of Biodiversity of Kazakhstan (ACBK) and the Royal Society for the Protection of Birds (RSPB).

South America
In South America, FZS furthers the protection of the biodiverse forests located at the Andes' eastern slope and the adjacent lowlands. 
Patrols, aerial view evaluation, the education of rangers and environmental education are supported here. 
On site, FZS collaborates, amongst others, with Crees Foundation and the Fondo de las Américas (FONDAM).

References

Zoological societies
Nature conservation organisations based in Germany
Organisations based in Frankfurt
Organizations established in 1858
International environmental organizations
Zoos in Germany
1858 establishments in Frankfurt